Tom Singer (born 27 April 1969) was a  English born baseball player. He spent seven years in minor league baseball and represented the United States national baseball team.

Singer was born in Banbury, United Kingdom. He attended Monsignor McClancy High School and then St. John's University. With St. John's, he pitched against Mike Mussina and Stanford University in the 1988 College World Series regionals. In 1989, he played for Team USA in that year's Intercontinental Cup.

He was drafted by the Toronto Blue Jays in the 10th round of the 1990 Major League Baseball Draft. He threw a no-hitter on 5 May 1992, while pitching for the Dunedin Blue Jays against the Fort Myers Miracle. Overall, Singer was 39–45 with a 4.62 ERA in 161 professional games (116 starts).

References

Living people
Date of birth missing (living people)
St. John's Red Storm baseball players
1969 births
English baseball players
St. Catharines Blue Jays players
Myrtle Beach Hurricanes players
Dunedin Blue Jays players
Bend Bandits players
Catskill Cougars players
Major League Baseball players from the United Kingdom
Major League Baseball players from England